Skrjabinelazia is a genus of nematodes belonging to the family Seuratidae.

The species of this genus are found in America.

Species:

Skrjabinelazia galliardi 
Skrjabinelazia hoffmanni 
Skrjabinelazia machidai 
Skrjabinelazia pyrenaica 
Skrjabinelazia taurica 
Skrjabinelazia vozae

References

Nematodes